Cairo Communication S.p.A. is an Italian media and publishing company based in Milan. The shares of the company float in Borsa Italiana. Urbano Cairo, via UT Communications, UT Belgium Holding, owned 50.101% stake of the company. In turn Cairo Communication owned 59.693% stake of fellow media company RCS MediaGroup, which was acquired in 2016.

History
Urbano Cairo found a company Cairo Pubblicità in 1995, which wholesale advertisement space for RCS MediaGroup. In 1997 Cairo acquired a company which found in 1984, and renamed into Cairo Communication, as the holding company of his media empire. Cairo Communication acquired La7 in 2013 from Telecom Italia. In 2016 Cairo Communication acquired RCS MediaGroup by offering to buy the shares from the public market, which was more favor than the offer from the rival consortium.

Publications and subsidiaries
 Cairo Editore
 Editoriale Giorgio Mondadori
 Airone
Edizioni Anabasi s.r.l. 
 RCS MediaGroup 
 La7 S.p.A.
 Cairo Network s.r.l. 
 Cairo Pubblicità S.p.A.
 Cairo Publishing S.r.l. 
 Il Trovatore

References

External links
 

Television networks in Italy
Italian-language television networks
Mass media in Milan
Publishing companies of Italy
 
Publishing companies established in 1995
Italian companies established in 1995